The 1962 Nebraska Cornhuskers football team was the representative of the University of Nebraska and member of the Big Eight Conference in the 1962 NCAA University Division football season. The team was coached by Bob Devaney and played their home games at Memorial Stadium in Lincoln, Nebraska. The November 3 game against Missouri marked the start of Nebraska's current NCAA record of 389 consecutive sellouts.

Schedule

Roster

Coaching staff

Game summaries

South Dakota

Michigan

Iowa State

NC State

Kansas State
This was the last Nebraska home football game to not be sold out.

Colorado

Missouri

This is the first game of Nebraska's NCAA record of consecutive sellouts, which currently stands at 386 sellouts continuing to the 2022 season.

Kansas

Oklahoma State

Oklahoma

Miami

After the season

Awards
 All Big 8: Robert Brown, Dennis Claridge, Tyrone Robertson

Future professional players
Robert Brown, 1964 2nd-round pick of the Philadelphia Eagles
Dennis Claridge, 1963 3rd-round pick of the Green Bay Packers
 Rudy Johnson, 1964 5th-round pick of the San Francisco 49ers
 Bob Jones, 1964 18th-round pick of the Washington Redskins
Monte Kiffin, 1964 15th-round pick of the Minnesota Vikings
John Kirby, 1964 5th-round pick of the Minnesota Vikings
Larry Kramer, 1964 15th-round pick of the Baltimore Colts
 Willie Ross, 1964 9th-round pick of the St. Louis Cardinals
 Dave Theisen, 1963 11th-round pick of the Los Angeles Rams
 Bill (Thunder) Thornton, 1963 5th-round pick of the St. Louis Cardinals
Lloyd Voss, 1964 1st-round pick of the Green Bay Packers

References

Nebraska
Nebraska Cornhuskers football seasons
Nebraska Cornhuskers football